Richard Parker (December 22, 1810 – November 10, 1893) was a nineteenth-century politician, lawyer, and judge from Virginia.

Biography
Born in Richmond, Virginia, son of Judge and Senator  Richard E. Parker. Parker studied law at the University of Virginia, and was admitted to the bar, commencing practice in Berryville, Virginia, near Winchester, where he lived. He was the paymaster at the Harpers Ferry Armory, and was also a slave owner.

He held several local offices before being elected as a Democrat to the United States House of Representatives in 1848, serving from 1849 to 1851. He was elected judge of the thirteenth judicial circuit of Virginia on January 15, 1851. In this capacity, Parker presided over the trials of John Brown and his associates in 1859, sentencing them to death for their raid on nearby Harpers Ferry. He published in 1888 his recollections of the trial.

Parker left the court in 1869, when the Union Army occupying Virginia shut courts down, and resumed practicing law in Winchester, Virginia, until his death there on November 10, 1893. He was interred in Mount Hebron Cemetery in Winchester.

He married Evalina Tucker Moss, but they had no children.

Parker's enslaved worker Presley Dunwood, who drove the carriage that took Judge Parker to court during John Brown's trial, published memoirs.

Publication

Archival material
 There are 87 items in the John Brown papers at Atlanta University.
 There are 134 items in the Chicago History Museum Research Center.
 There are 38 items in the  Stoddert Family papers at the University of Maryland Libraries

References

Further reading

External links

1810 births
1893 deaths
Virginia lawyers
Politicians from Richmond, Virginia
Politicians from Winchester, Virginia
Democratic Party members of the United States House of Representatives from Virginia
19th-century American politicians
People from Berryville, Virginia
John Brown's raid on Harpers Ferry
American slave owners
Burials at Mount Hebron Cemetery (Winchester, Virginia)
Virginia circuit court judges